Kella (before 1926: Γκορνίτσοβον - Gkornitsovon; Bulgarian/Macedonian: Горничево, Gorničevo or Gornichevo) is a village in the Amyntaio municipality of the Florina regional unit, Greece.

History

The village was first mentioned in an Ottoman defter of 1468, where it is listed under the name of Gorničevo and described as a small settlement of thirty households. A second defter of 1481 records that the number had increased by only three households.

Around 1840, the land of the village was forcibly seized by the Muslim notable Ilyaz Pasha and it was turned into a homestead. Later, the local residents were able to redeem their property.

In the book “Ethnographie des Vilayets d'Adrianople, de Monastir et de Salonique”, published in Constantinople in 1878, that reflects the statistics of the male population in 1873, Gornitchévo was noted as a village with 160 households, 522  Bulgarian and 50 Romani inhabitants.

Kella had 877 inhabitants in 1981. In fieldwork done by Riki Van Boeschoten in late 1993, Kella was populated by Slavophones. The Macedonian language was used by people of all ages, both in public and private settings, and as the main language for interpersonal relationships. Some elderly villagers had little knowledge of Greek.

Notes

Populated places in Florina (regional unit)
Amyntaio